Upstream is an independent oil and gas industry upstream sector weekly newspaper and a daily internet news site. The newspaper is owned by NHST Media Group. It is headquartered in Oslo, Norway. The newspaper covers the upstream sector of the global oil and gas industry with full-time staff correspondents in all the major centres of the industry. It is published every Friday.  Upstream had full-time reporters based in its head office in Oslo, as well as bureaux and correspondents in London, Moscow, Accra, New Delhi, Singapore, Wellington, Rio de Janeiro and Houston. Its editor in chief is Erik Means.

The newspaper was founded in 1996 to compete with well-established rivals including Oil & Gas Journal, Petroleum Intelligence Weekly, and Offshore Engineer. It covers all aspects of the upstream industry, but focuses especially on news related to business, policy and the sector's key players as well as the commercial side of the industry.  Coverage includes exploration, field development, contracts, company news, technological developments and the liquefied natural gas sector, as well as political and financial news which affects the exploration and production sector.

In 2001, Upstream added an online edition, upstreamonline.com, which is updated 24 hours a day, five days a week from London, Oslo, Houston and Perth. It provides breaking news and online feature articles written by a dedicated online editorial team, as well as giving access to digital versions of the newspaper in various formats.

References

External links
 

Newspapers established in 1996
Weekly newspapers published in Norway
Business newspapers
Newspapers published in Oslo
Petroleum magazines
1996 establishments in Norway